Justin Abdou (born 18 January 1971) is a Canadian wrestler. He competed in the 2000 Summer Olympics.

References

1971 births
Living people
Wrestlers at the 2000 Summer Olympics
Canadian male sport wrestlers
Olympic wrestlers of Canada
Sportspeople from Moose Jaw
Commonwealth Games medallists in wrestling
Commonwealth Games gold medallists for Canada
Wrestlers at the 1994 Commonwealth Games
20th-century Canadian people
Medallists at the 1994 Commonwealth Games